Trigueros may refer to:
 Trigueros, Huelva, Spain;
 Trigueros del Valle, Valladolid, Spain;
 Manu Trigueros, Spanish footballer